The Hagelsund Bridge is a suspension bridge in Alver Municipality in Vestland county, Norway. The bridge connects the island of Flatøy with the village of Knarvik on the mainland.

The bridge consists of 2 lanes with car traffic heading in opposite directions, and a walkway for pedestrians and bicycles.  The bridge has a  clearance above the ocean for boats to pass beneath the bridge.

The bridge was opened in 1982 and together with the Nordhordland Bridge and the Krossnessund Bridge, it is a part of the triangular bridge network connecting Flatøy with the island of Holsnøy to the west, the city of Bergen to the south, and the municipality of Alver to the east.

See also
List of bridges in Norway
List of bridges in Norway by length

References

Bridges completed in 1982
Suspension bridges in Norway
Road bridges in Vestland
Alver (municipality)
1982 establishments in Norway
European route E39 in Norway
Former toll bridges in Norway